Mimudea bryophilalis is a moth in the family Crambidae. It was described by George Hampson in 1903. It is found in Himachal Pradesh, India.

References

Moths described in 1913
Spilomelinae